Jay Street may refer to:

Transportation
Jay Street – MetroTech (New York City Subway), a New York City Subway station complex at Jay, Lawrence and Willoughby Streets in Brooklyn consisting of:
Jay Street – MetroTech (IND Fulton Street Line); serving the 
Jay Street – MetroTech (IND Culver Line); serving the 
Jay Street – MetroTech (BMT Fourth Avenue Line); serving the 
Bridge–Jay Streets (BMT Myrtle Avenue Line), a demolished New York City Subway elevated station

People
Jay Street, a pen name of Henry Slesar

See also
Jay Street Bridge, in Pennsylvania